Milan Holeček won the title, defeating Bob Carmichael 6–4, 10–8, 3–6, 6–3 in the final.

Draw

Final

Top half

Section 1

Section 2

Bottom half

Section 3

Section 4

External links
 1968 Paris Open Draw

Singles